Television in Angola was introduced in 1973. 

The following is a list of television channels broadcast in Angola.

Main channels

Other channels

See also 
 Lists of television channels

 
Television